Leontis is a phyle which had twenty demes at the time of the creation of the phyle, which is at the time of the creation of a group of ten phylai.

The phyle is shown on the base of a statue made after an anthippasia to commemorate the victory of the phyle at the mock battle.

Themistocles belonged to this phyle.

Two horse-men are listed as part of the Catalogus Hippeum in history who possibly belonged to this phyle, they were Euktimenos and Euthymenes, both living during the 3rd century B.C.E.

Sources

Tribes of ancient Attica